Lithium stearate is a chemical compound with the formula LiO2C(CH2)16CH3. It is formally classified as a soap (a salt of a fatty acid). Lithium stearate is a white soft solid, prepared by the reaction of lithium hydroxide and stearic acid.

Lithium stearate and lithium 12-hydroxystearate are lithium soaps, and are components of lithium greases and release agents.

References

External links
chemical land

Lithium salts
Organolithium compounds
Stearates